Photographic composition techniques are used to set up the elements of a picture. These are the techniques which resembles the way we humans normally see a view

Some of the main techniques that are:
 Simplicity (photography)
 Symmetrical balance
 Asymmetrical balance
 Radial balance
 Rule of thirds
 Leading lines
 Golden Ratio
 Framing (photography)
Centered composition
Diagonal triangles
Rule of odds
Rule of space

The composition techniques in photography are mere guidelines to help beginners capture eye-catching images. These provide a great starting point until an individual is able to out grow them in capturing images through more advance techniques.

See also

Composition (visual arts)

References

OCCSB–issued documents
Facilitator's Guide
24 Composition Techniques In Photography To Improve Your Photos

Composition techniques, List of photographic
Lists of photography topics
Composition in visual art